Spilomyia pleuralis is a species of Hoverfly in the family Syrphidae.

Distribution
Mexico.

References

Eristalinae
Insects described in 1887
Taxa named by Samuel Wendell Williston
Diptera of North America